Cyriac Abby Philips is an Indian hepatologist and clinician-scientist. He is known for his critical views of alternative medicine on social media.

Early life 
Philips was born in Kottayam, in the state of Kerala, the third of four siblings.

Career 
In 2019, Philips co-authored a paper analyzing the death of a woman who died after taking Herbalife's dietary supplements, which was later retracted by Journal of Clinical and Experimental Hepatology. The retraction was undone, after microbiologist Elisabeth Bik and Retraction Watch, published the paper on their respective blogs.

Philips is known for airing his critical views of Ayurveda, Homeopathy and other alternative medicine systems, on Twitter and YouTube. According to him, the "principles and practice of ayurveda are based on essentially primitive, untested, observations from an ancient past which lack scientific rigour”. He has been the target of defamation lawsuits from Kerala State Medical Council for Indian Systems of Medicine, Ayurveda Medical Association of India, and various ayurvedic medicine manufacturers. In a research published in Hepatology Communications, Philips and other researchers concluded that Homeopathic remedies can potentially result in severe liver injuries. He claims, "[Homeopathy] is not medicine, but an extreme form of quackery."

Philips works as a senior consultant hepatologist and physician-scientist at Rajagiri Hospital in Kochi.

Personal life 
He is the son of Padma Shri recipient, Philip Augustine, and is the father of two daughters and a son.

References

External links
 

Medical doctors from Kerala
Living people
Indian hepatologists